Cambarellus chihuahuae, the Chihuahua dwarf crayfish, is a small, freshwater crayfish endemic to Chihuahua in Mexico. It shares this habitat with the co-endemic Cyprinodon fontinalis and Cyprinella bocagrande

Regular surveys are carried out of the spring site to observe the three endangered species, and when a 2009 survey found most springs dry, and the only one with water to contain no crayfish, it was considered as being extinct in 2010. Further surveys, looking for fish, led to its rediscovery in September 2012.

References

Cambaridae
Taxa named by Horton H. Hobbs Jr.
Freshwater crustaceans of North America
Crustaceans described in 1980
Endemic fauna of Mexico